Lawrence County High School can refer to several high schools in the United States:
Lawrence County High School (Alabama) — Moulton, Alabama
Lawrence County High School (Kentucky) — Louisa, Kentucky
Lawrence County High School (Mississippi) — Monticello, Mississippi
Lawrence County High School (Tennessee) — Lawrenceburg, Tennessee